Procambarus pubescens, the brushnose crayfish, is a species of freshwater crayfish native to Georgia and South Carolina in the United States.

References

Cambaridae
Freshwater crustaceans of North America
Crustaceans described in 1884
Taxa named by Walter Faxon